Superhuman is an email app founded in 2014 by Rahul Vohra. It is targeted at users who want to improve their productivity and features liberal use of keyboard shortcuts to speed up email reading and replying. The app charges $30/month to users ($10 for students) and claims they can save up to three hours a week by using it.

Superhuman has raised over $100 million from venture capitalists including Andreesen Horowitz. Initially, the app only integrated with Gmail, but in May 2022 launched integration with Microsoft Outlook.

References 

Email clients
Technology companies